Psychological Injury and Law is a peer-reviewed academic journal published by Springer Science+Business Media on behalf of the Association for Scientific Advancement in Psychological Injury and Law (ASAPIL). The current editor-in-chief, Gerald Young (York University), launched the journal in 2008.

The journal covers forensic psychology, especially
the interface of psychological injury and the law, such as psychological evaluations of psychological trauma in personal injury lawsuits; workers compensation claims; or legal considerations for expert opinions in U.S. veterans disability cases. The journal publishes three or four volumes per year, often centered around a specific theme. The editorial board solicits manuscripts internationally (as long as they are written in English) and has published research from scholars in Canada, China, Denmark, Ethiopia, Germany, India, Italy, Iran, the Netherlands, the United Kingdom, the United States, and other countries.

Abstracting and indexing 
The journal is abstracted and indexed in Scopus, PsycINFO, and Academic OneFile.

References

External links 
 

Springer Science+Business Media academic journals
Forensic psychology journals
Publications established in 2008
English-language journals
Forensic psychiatry journals
Mental health law
Quarterly journals